Events from the year 1674 in Sweden

Incumbents
 Monarch – Charles XI

Events

 
 In accordance with the treaty with France, Sweden invades Brandenburg. 
 Lorenzo Magalotti publishes his book about his travel in Sweden, Sverige under år 1674.
 The fortifications of Landskrona by Erik Dahlbergh is completed. 
 Gustav Düben publishes his composition of the poem of Samuel Columbus, Odæ Sveticæ.
  by Johan Stiernhöök.
 Foundation of the eldest auction chamber in Stockholm: Stockholms Auctions- och Adresse Cammare.
 The building of the Swedish House of Lords in Stockholm is completed.

Births

 14 April - Magnus Julius De la Gardie, general and politician (died 1641)

Deaths

 5 January - Ebba Brahe, landowner and the love interest of Gustavus Adolphus  (born 1596) 
 Lucidor, poet  (born 1638) 
 Beata Rosenhane, poet, scholar and early feminist  (born 1738) 
 

 Erik Gabrielsson Emporagrius, professor and bishop  (born 1606)

References

 
Years of the 17th century in Sweden
Sweden